Tecla San Andres Ziga (1906–1992) was a female senator in the Philippines notable for being the first woman in the country to top the bar examination for law-degree graduates.

Biography

Early years
She was born 23 August 1906, in Nueva Caceres (now Naga, Camarines Sur).

Education
San Andres Ziga obtained her elementary education from the Santa Isabel College. She gained her high school education from the Catholic Central School. In 1930, she obtained her degrees in Liberal Arts and in Law from the University of the Philippines. She took the bar examination in 1931.

Career
San Andres Ziga first worked as an assistant attorney at the DeWitt Law Office. After seven years there, she took and passed the 1937 Philippine Civil Service examination. After topping the said examination, San Andres Ziga worked for the Department of Justice. She was elected to the House of Representatives, representing Albay's 1st district, through a special election held on November 8, 1955, to serve the unfinished term of her late brother-in-law Lorenzo Ziga. She was re-elected in 1957 and served until 1961. She later became an administrator of the Philippine Social Welfare Administration. She was elected as a senator in 1963. Her political agenda as senator focused on the protection of women and children and regulation of practice in dietetics, among others.. She ran for re-election in 1969, but lost

Family life
San Andres Ziga was the wife of Venancio Ziga, a former governor and then congressman of the first district of Albay, Camarines Sur. They are the parents of Victor Ziga.

Later years
She died 17 August 1992, in Manila.

References

1906 births
1992 deaths
Senators of the 6th Congress of the Philippines
Members of the House of Representatives of the Philippines from Albay
People from Naga, Camarines Sur
Filipino women lawyers
20th-century Filipino women politicians
20th-century Filipino politicians
University of the Philippines alumni
Women members of the Senate of the Philippines
Women members of the House of Representatives of the Philippines
Senators of the 5th Congress of the Philippines
20th-century women lawyers
20th-century Filipino lawyers